Erattupetta is a municipal town located in Kottayam district, state of Kerala, India,. It is located 38 km east of Kottayam, the district capital. The famous St. George's Syro-Malabar Catholic Forane Church, Aruvithura is located here.  

Erattupetta Grama Panchayath was founded in 1964 and upgraded to a municipality in 2015.

The "Eraaru" part in all the variations of the names arose from the geographical location, where the two rivers (aaru) merge as single one and "Petta" means town. Erattupetta is situated in the foothills of High Ranges. Hence the place is also known as "the gateway of High range/Malanadu."

Etymology
The "Eraaru" part in all the variation of the names arose from the geographical location, where the two rivers (aaru) merge as a single one. Erattupetta is situated in the foothills of High Ranges. 'Peta' means town in Dravidian languages. Earlier it was known as 'Erapoli' or 'Erapuzha'. It was the commercial capital of the Poonjar principality until 1949.

Economy

In the past, hill produce from the Cardamom Hills were brought down by the 'Muthuvans'' for trade.   Erattupetta is a trading centre for spices, rubber, areca nut and other agricultural products. Wagamon, a Hill Station, lies some 22  km east of Erattupetta. Erattupetta has a large number of expatriate population living in Gulf countries, especially in United Arab Emirates and Saudi Arabia.

Demographics
 India census, Erattupetta had a population of 29,675. Males constitute 51% of the population and females 49%. Erattupetta has an average literacy rate of 90%, higher than the national average of 59.5%: male literacy is 83%, and female literacy is 76%. In Erattupetta, 14% of the population is under 6 years of age.

Geography

Erattupetta can be accessed easily from north Kerala via the Angamaly-Muvattupuzha-Thodupuzha-Muttom route.  It is well connected to Tamil Nadu via Kottayam-Kumali (K K) Road to Madurai through the nearest town Mundakkayam via Parathanam, which is 27 kilometres from Erattupetta.

It has an average elevation of 36 metres (118 feet).

Politics 

Erattupetta is a municipality. The current municipal chairperson is Suhara Abdul Khader.

Erattupetta comes under the Pathanamthitta Loksabha constituency and the Poonjar assembly constituency.  Erattupetta is represented in the Loksabha by Anto Antony and in the state assembly by Sebastian Kulathunkal.

Localities 

 Aruvithura

Notable people 

 P. C. George (born 1951), legislator and Chief Whip of Kerala from 2011 to 2015

References

External links
 https://erattupettamunicipality.lsgkerala.gov.in/en/
 http://lsgkerala.in/erattupettapanchayat/
 https://www.citypopulation.de/en/india/kerala/

Cities and towns in Kottayam district